The dusky rat (Rattus colletti) is an indigenous species of rodent in the family Muridae found in Australia.

Name
Kunwinjku people of western Arnhem Land call this animal mulbbu, a name also applied to other rodent species. It was first described in 1904 by British zoologist Oldfield Thomas.

Range
The rat is found only in the monsoonal subcoastal plains of the Northern Territory, Australia.

Predation
The dusky rat is eaten according to Peterson Nganjmirra and is prey to the Australian water python ((Liasis fuscus) also ranging across northern Australia.

References 

Rattus
Mammals of the Northern Territory
Rodents of Australia
Mammals described in 1904
Taxa named by Oldfield Thomas
Taxonomy articles created by Polbot